The Rose and Crown is a public house in St Michael's Street, St Albans, Hertfordshire, England.  The building appears to be eighteenth century and is listed Grade II with Historic England. It has been designated as an asset of community value.

References

External links 
http://www.roseandcrownstalbans.co.uk/

Pubs in St Albans
Grade II listed pubs in Hertfordshire